Aubrey Frances Anderson-Emmons (born June 2007) is an American actress. She is known for her role as Lily Tucker-Pritchett on ABC's Modern Family.

Personal life
Anderson-Emmons is the daughter of Korean American Amy Anderson and Kent Emmons, who are separated. Her mother is a stand-up comedian, actress and manager. Her father is a media entrepreneur.

Anderson-Emmons does charity work for St. Jude Children's Hospital, California Covenant House Youth Shelter, Let Them Play Sports Organization, Juvenile Diabetes Research Foundation, Olive Crest, Help A Mother Out, My Stuff Bags, EIF Revlon Run/Walk For Women and Dave Thomas Foundation For Adoption.

Career
Anderson-Emmons joined the cast of Modern Family in its third season in 2011, when she replaced Ella and Jaden Hiller in the role of Lily Tucker-Pritchett, a Vietnamese-born child adopted by a gay American couple. Her role has been praised for raising cultural diversity awareness. In 2011, at age 4, she became the youngest person ever to receive the Screen Actors Guild Award, which she won as part of the show's ensemble cast.

She was the youngest Asian American child star on the red carpet at the 2012 and 2013 Primetime Emmy Awards.

Anderson Emmons has a YouTube channel, FoodMania Review, with her mother, Amy, which she began in 2015. As of June 2022, she has over 40,000 subscribers and over 4.6 million combined views.

Filmography

References

External links
 

2007 births
Living people
American child actresses
Actresses from Santa Monica, California
American people of South Korean descent
American television actresses
21st-century American actresses
American actresses of Korean descent